Friedrich Ostendorff (born 12 January 1953) is a German politician. Born in Dortmund, North Rhine-Westphalia, he represents the Alliance 90/The Greens. Friedrich Ostendorff has served as a member of the Bundestag from the state of North Rhine-Westphalia from 2002 till 2005 and since 2009.

Life 
After the intermediate school leaving certificate at the Realschule Oberaden in Bergkamen in 1968 and the subsequent agricultural training from 1968 to 1974, Ostendorff completed his master craftsman's examination as a farmer in 1974. Since 1971 he has been a member of the Westphalia-Lippe Rural Youth. In 1977 an agricultural internship abroad in Japan followed and in 1978 he finally took over his parents' farm in Bergkamen-Weddinghofen. Today his wife runs the organic farm. In 1983 he converted his farm to organic farming. He is a member of the Bundestag Committee for Food and Agriculture. For his parliamentary group he is spokesman for agricultural policy.

References

External links 

  
 Bundestag biography 

1953 births
Living people
Politicians from Dortmund
Members of the Bundestag for North Rhine-Westphalia
Members of the Bundestag 2017–2021
Members of the Bundestag 2013–2017
Members of the Bundestag 2009–2013
Members of the Bundestag 2002–2005
Members of the Bundestag for Alliance 90/The Greens